Khosrov IV was a noble of the Arsacid dynasty who served as the Sasanian client king of Armenia from 385 until 389.

Origins
The exact origins of Khosrov IV are unknown. The Armenian historians of the 5th century, Faustus of Byzantium and Moses of Chorene, present Khosrov IV as a prince from the Arsacid dynasty without mentioning his parentage. Another Armenian historian, Ghazar Parpetsi, who lived between the 5th and 6th centuries, also mentions Khosrov as an Arsacid prince and names him as the brother of Vramshapuh and the uncle of Artaxias IV (Artashir IV). According to modern genealogies, Khosrov IV was one of the sons of Varasdates (Varazdat), who ruled Armenia from 374 to 378. He was the namesake of his ancestor Khosrov III and was also the namesake of his Armenian and Parthian monarch ancestors who ruled with this name. Khosrov IV was born and raised in Armenia and little is known of his life prior to his kingship.

Rise to the throne
The rise of Khosrov IV to the throne is associated with the reign of the last two ruling Roman client kings of Armenia, Arsaces III (Arshak III) and his brother Vologases III (Vagharsh III), who ruled together as co-kings under the powerful regency of Manuel Mamikonian, whose family was pro-Roman. Manuel died around 385 and Vologases III died around the same time without an heir, leaving Arsaces III as the sole ruler of Armenia. However, Arsaces's position was precarious and he was soon forced to flee west to Ekełeacʻ (Ekeghiats) by the pro-Persian faction of Armenian nakharars (high-ranking nobles). The Armenian nobles then requested that the Sasanian king Shapur III send them an Arsacid king. Shapur III was delighted by the request of the Armenians and with their consent appointed Khosrov IV as King of Armenia, ruling over the eastern part of the country under Persian suzerainty. Afterwards, Shapur III crowned Khosrov himself. Khosrov IV kept the Arsacid capitals of Artashat and Dvin in his kingdom. 

In 387, Shapur III and the Roman emperor Theodosius I formalized their partition of Armenia with the Peace of Acilisene (Ekełeacʻ). The Armenian kingdom was partitioned into Western Armenia under Roman rule and Eastern Armenia under Sassanid rule, with the new border running from Erzurum to Mush. Arsaces III ruled a small Roman vassal kingdom in Western Armenia from Ekełeacʻ until his death ca. 390, leaving no heirs. Western Armenia was then annexed and divided into two provinces of the Roman Empire, Armenia I and Armenia II. After the partition of Armenia and the death of Arsaces III, many Armenians that lived in Western Armenia moved into Eastern Armenia, including many of the nakharars. The partition of Armenia marked the last stage of Arsacid rule in Armenia.

Reign

Shapur III gave his sister Zruanduxt as wife to Khosrov IV, as well as a large army to protect Armenia and a tutor named Zik for the Armenian king. Little is known of Khosrov IV’s relationship with Zruanduxt except that they had two sons together: Tigranes and Arsaces.

During his reign, Khosrov IV showed too great assertiveness of his royal authority, which displeased his Sassanid overlords. In the first year of his kingship, Khosrov IV appointed Sahak, son of Nerses as the Armenian Catholicos (Patriarch). Sahak was a distant relative of Khosrov IV and was the last in a line of Armenian catholicoi directly descended from Gregory the Illuminator (the Gregorids). In 387, Khosrov IV appointed Mesrop Mashtots, who would later devise the Armenian alphabet, as his royal secretary on account of his piety and learned background. He restored many nakharars to their former noble status and he was well known for his sympathies towards the Byzantine Empire, in particular to Theodosius I and his family. 

In 388, Shapur III died and was succeeded by his son Bahram IV. Sometime in 389, Bahram IV dethroned Khosrov IV and placed him in confinement in Ctesiphon. Bahram IV was unsatisfied with Khosrov IV, most likely for the appointment of Sahak as catholicos without consulting the Sasanian authorities. In 389, Bahram IV replaced Khosrov IV with the latter's brother Vramshapuh as King of Armenia. The fate of the wife and sons of Khosrov IV after this is unknown. 

Khosrov IV was released from political exile either in the final years of the reign of his brother or after the latter's death in 417. After the death of Vramshapuh, Catholicos Sahak visited the court of the Sassanid King Yazdegerd I to request Khosrov's release from political exile, to which Yazdegerd consented assented. 

Khosrov may have served again as King of Armenia from 417 until about 418 following his release from forced exile, since his nephew, Artaxias IV, was too young to succeed his father. If so, his second reign only lasted up to a year, as he died in 418. From 417 to 422, Armenia was under the direct rule of the nakharars and the Sasanian Empire. In 422, Artaxias IV was appointed King of Armenia by the Sasanian dynasty.

References

Sources
 Faustus of Byzantium, History of the Armenians
 Moses of Chorene, History of Armenia
 Ghazar Parpetsi, History of Armenia
 C. Toumanoff, Manuel de généalogie et de chronologie pour l'histoire de la Caucasie chrétien (Arménie - Géorgie - Albanie), ED. Aquila, Rome, 1976
 N. Garsoïan, "The Aršakuni Dynasty" in The Armenian People From Ancient to Modern Times, Volume I: The Dynastic Periods: From Antiquity to the Fourteenth Century, ed. R. G. Hovannisian, Palgrave Macmillan, 2004
 C. Settipani, Continuité des élites à Byzance durant les siècles obscurs. Les princes caucasiens et l'Empire du VIe au IXe siècle, de Boccard, Paris, 2006
 A. Topchyan, The Problem of the Greek Sources of Movses Xorenac’i’s History of Armenia, Peeters Publishers, 2006
 V.M. Kurkjian, A History of Armenia, Indo-European Publishing, 2008
 Coinage and information on Sassanid Kings

See also
 Bahram IV
 Mesrop Mashtots
 Shapur III
 Yazdegerd I

4th-century kings of Armenia
5th-century kings of Armenia
Vassal rulers of the Sasanian Empire
Arsacid kings of Armenia